Auburndale is an unincorporated area in Alberta, Canada.

The community takes its name from Auburndale, Massachusetts, the native home of a first settler.

References 

Localities in the County of Vermilion River